On December 15, 2021, the Midwestern U.S. state of Kansas was met with strong and damaging winds caused by the December 2021 Midwest derecho and tornado outbreak, which produced dust storms and multiple wildfires. The western and central portions of Kansas were mostly affected by the fires. Before December 15, forecasters had predicted that dry air, gusty winds, and warm temperatures could be present throughout the following days, creating conditions favorable for wildfires to spread quickly through the area.

Due to gusty winds that were in attendance in the area, the toppling of power lines started to take place, sparking a few wildfires. Drought conditions also played a role in the wildfire outbreak, in which the western and central portions of Kansas were "Abnormally Dry" and in "Severe Drought". The drought and wildfires significantly impacted Kansas agricultural operations by not being able to produce livestock.

Background 
The Kansas wildfire season usually begins and progresses through the spring. But unusual drought conditions started to emerge in Western Kansas; the drought eventually advanced into parts of Central Kansas in the autumn as a result of no recorded rainfall since November 3, 2021. Due to drought in the region, farmers were unable to grow crops such as wheat.

The weather forecast showed relative humidity on Wednesday, December 15, being at 10 to 15 percent. The forecast also showed winds being at their strongest peak in the afternoon on December 15. The National Weather Service had recommended residents of Western and Central Kansas to stay inside their homes due to a high risk of blowing dust.

Wildfire outbreak 
Two major grass fires were being monitored until both of them had merged into one large wildfire, being named the Four County Fire. By 3:06 a.m. Due to the wildfires and strong winds, 24 out of the 105 counties in Kansas issued local disaster declarations. Most of the wildfires ravaged the counties of Ellis, Osborne, Rooks, and Russell. In Russell County, wildfires prompted evacuations of 500 to 600 residents for the areas of Waldo, Paradise, and Fairport. Wildfires burned and destroyed multiple homes and businesses in their path, mainly in the city of Paradise. Many families in Paradise lost their homes, ranches, and cattle due to the wind-driven wildfires.

To assist firefighters in battling the raging wildfires, on December 16, the Kansas National Guard mobilized UH-60 Black Hawk helicopters to help firefighters get a hold of the fires burning in Western and Central Kansas. Earlier on the evening of December 15, while firefighters were trying to get the fast-moving fires under control, smoke from the Four County Fire had traveled for miles, and smoke was eventually seen from Lincoln, Nebraska. Later that day, on December 16, aircraft were ultimately able to fly over wildfire-ravaged areas because of wind speeds having to decrease. On December 17, several wildfires were still burning, but not as intensely as they were on December 15. Throughout the following days, relative humidity had dropped into the mid-20s, which made efforts for firefighters to put out the blazes difficult.

Two days later, on December 17, the North Wichita Fire was fully contained, with a burned area of 7,572 acres (3,064 ha). The wildfire destroyed five structures and cost approximately $46,000 (2021 USD). The wildfire also destroyed five structures and cost approximately $25,000. The cost of the wildfire is still unknown.

Fatalities 
A total of two fatalities were confirmed of an 84-year-old rancher who lived near the city of Leoti, Kansas, and of a 36-year-old man whose remains were found near his vehicle, which was also burned. Both men were killed due to sustained burn injuries caused by the wildfires. The 84-year-old man named Richard Shimanek was badly injured in the wildfires while trying to save his home. He was later taken to a hospital in Denver, Colorado, where he later died due to his injuries. The second fatality, a 36-year-old man named Derrick Kelley, who was first reported missing by his fiancée on Wednesday, December 15, during the wildfire outbreak. Derrick Kelley was reportedly last seen in Hays, Kansas, on December 15, soon before his fiancée reported him missing. On the morning of December 17, his body was found next to his burnt vehicle.

Cause 
Dry grassland due to abnormally dry and severe drought conditions in Western and Central Kansas helped the December 15 wildfires to spread quickly into nearby cities and towns, destroying numerous structures. High winds also contributed to the development of the wildfires. In some cases, the wind toppled power lines, sparking new major fires. At the time, warm temperatures and low humidity were also present, making conditions even more favorable for the fires burning near the cities of Paradise and Waldo.

Aftermath 
Mainly in the cities of Paradise and Waldo, more than 42 structures were destroyed. The windstorm and wildfires caused more than $2.3 million (2021 USD) worth of damage. The wildfire outbreak also had an impact on Kansas agricultural operations and also had an impact on the company, Midwest Energy. Approximately 700 power poles belonging to Midwest Energy were toppled during the wind and wildfire event. Because of the drought and wildfires, the production of livestock and crops grew slim due to an impact on Kansas agricultural operations. Disaster assistance was provided by the U.S. Department of Agriculture (USDA) to Kansas ranchers and farmers who were mostly affected by the disaster. Producers who lost livestock such as cattle were entitled to the Livestock Indemnity Program (LIP).

Gallery

See also 
Wildfires in 2021
Wildfires in the United States
List of natural disasters in the United States
2021-2022 Boulder County fires – Another wildfire outbreak that occurred 15 days later on December 30, 2021, in Boulder County, Colorado.

Notes

References 

History of Kansas
2021 wildfires in the United States
December 2021 events in the United States
Wildfires in Kansas
2021 in Kansas